Godzilla Island consists of 256 episodes, each of which is 3 minutes long. The episodes make up 22 complete stories of varying lengths - one is only 3 episodes long, while the final arc is 23 episodes, so stories can take anywhere between half a week and three weeks to fully air.

Story 1 (Godzilla and Spacegodzilla Saga)

Story 2 (Mothra and King Ghidorah Saga)

Story 3 (Godzilla the Prisoner)

Story 4 (Godzilla Junior Saga)

Story 5 (All Giant Monsters Saga)

Story 6 (Mothra and Mothra Leo Saga)

Story 7 (Mecha-King Ghidorah Saga)

Story 8 (The Mystery of Godzilla Island Saga)

Story 9 (Godzilla vs. Godzilla Island Saga)

Story 10 (Torema X Zaguresu Saga)

Story 11 (Shadow-Mechagodzilla Saga)

Story 12 (Proto Moguera Saga)

Story 13 (Godzilla and Torema Saga)

Story 14 (King Ghidorah and Medic Jet Jaguar Saga)

Story 15 (Mothra Larva Saga)

Story 16 (Gigan, Dororin and Firefighter Jet Jaguar Saga)

Story 17 (Anguirus X Gororin saga)

Story 18 (Spacegodzilla Saga)

Story 19 (Fire Rodan and Neo-Hedorah Saga)

Story 20 (G-Guard and Camero Saga)

Story 21 (Gotengo Saga)

Story 22 (Final Battle: Mecha-King Ghidorah Saga)

References

External links
tv/godzilla island.htm Tohokingdom

Godzilla Island